Aleksandr Ivanovich Filippov (1892–1962) was an association football player. Filippov made his debut for the Russian Empire on 30 June 1912 in a 1912 Olympics game against Finland.

References

External links
  Profile

1892 births
1962 deaths
Russian footballers
Russia international footballers
Footballers at the 1912 Summer Olympics
Olympic footballers of Russia
Association football forwards